Cuthbert Brodrick FRIBA (1 December 1821 – 2 March 1905) was a British architect, whose most famous building is Leeds Town Hall.

Early life 
Brodrick was born in the Yorkshire port of Hull where his father was a well-to-do merchant and shipowner. He was the sixth son of ten children of John and Hannah Brodrick. The family lived at 39 George Street in the best residential area of Hull.

Education and training 
Brodrick attended Kingston College in Hull and, on leaving school, he became an articled pupil in the architectural practice of Henry Francis Lockwood whose premises were at 8 Dock Street. Brodrick remained at Lockwoods from 1837 until May 1844 when he embarked on the Grand Tour to continue his studies. He travelled through France to Rome in Italy. Whilst on the tour, he studied architecture in Paris; it influenced his later designs.

When Brodrick returned to Hull in 1846, he was offered a partnership in Lockwood's firm. He refused this, and set up in practice on his own at 1, Savile Street in Hull. He designed a number of local buildings in Hull including the Hull Royal Institution building and the Guildhall in Hull.

Leeds 

In 1852, aged 29, Brodrick entered and won a competition for the design of Leeds Town Hall. The competition was judged by Charles Barry. The town hall was opened in September 1858 by Queen Victoria. Brodrick  moved to an office at 30 Park Row, Leeds and acquired the nickname 'Town Hall, Leeds'.

His only church was Headingley Congregational Church on Headingley Lane.

Notable buildings

Leeds
 Leeds Town Hall, 1858
 Leeds Corn Exchange, 1860
 The Mechanics' Institute, 1860 (later Civic Theatre and now Leeds City Museum)
 The Oriental Baths in Cookridge Street, 1866 (demolished)
 King Street Warehouses, 1862 (demolished)
 Headingley Hill Congregational Church, 1864 (As of 2021 the building was out of use, with unused planning permission for flats)
 Moorland Terrace, 1859 (demolished)
 9 Alma Road, 1859
 49–51 Cookridge Street, 1864

Elsewhere

Brodrick designed the Grand Hotel in Scarborough. Completed in 1867, it was one of the largest hotels in the world.

Brodrick designed Yokefleet Hall, Yorkshire which commenced building in 1868. Many properties in Yokefleet were built around the time and in style of the house, including two lodges, east and west of the hall.

Brodrick designed Wells House which opened in 1856 as a Hydro, offering water treatments and pure air.

Personal life 
In 1870, Brodrick moved to France where in 1876 he bought a house at Le Vésinet, St. Germain-en-Laye. He retired in 1875, and spent his time painting, exhibiting his work and gardening. In about 1898 he went to live with his niece in Jersey, where he rented a house, La Colline, at Gorey. Whilst living there he designed, and planted a garden. He died in Jersey on 2 March 1905, and is buried in St Martin's Churchyard.

Legacy 
Among Brodrick's pupils was Joseph Wright.

A Wetherspoons public house, the 'Cuthbert Brodrick', opened on 22 October 2007 on Millennium Square in Leeds opposite one of the buildings he designed (the Leeds City Museum) and not far from another (Leeds Town Hall). It is near the site on Cookridge Street of the Oriental Baths which he also designed; they were built in 1866 and demolished in 1969.

Brodrick was the subject of a 2007 BBC2 television programme, The Case of the Disappearing Architect, by Jonathan Meades.

Cuthbert Brodrick is commemorated on four blue plaques, on Leeds Town Hall, Brodrick's Building, Wells House and Leeds Corn Exchange.

References

Further reading
 

1821 births
1905 deaths
19th-century English architects
Architects from Kingston upon Hull
English emigrants to France
Fellows of the Royal Institute of British Architects
British neoclassical architects
Architects from Yorkshire
Leeds Blue Plaques